The Plague in Florence (German: Pest in Florenz) is a 1919 German silent historical film directed by Otto Rippert for Eric Pommer's Deutsche Eclair (Decla) production company. The screenplay was written by Fritz Lang. It stars Marga von Kierska, Theodor Becker, Karl Bernhard and Julietta Brandt.  The film is a tragic romance set in Florence in 1348, just before the first outbreaks in Italy of the Black Death, which then spread out across the entire continent.

Lang's screenplay was based on the Edgar Allan Poe story "The Masque of the Red Death", but he heightened the story's sexual tension by making the plague appear in the form of a beautiful seductress.

Plot
Julia, a rich courtesan (Marga von Kierska), arrives in Florence. A cardinal fears that her beauty could rival the church's power, and orders inquiries to be made about her Christian beliefs. Cesare, the city's ruler, and Lorenzo (his son) both fall madly in love with her. A mob, led by Lorenzo, storms the palace where Julia is about to be tortured. Lorenzo kills Cesare, his father, and rescues her. Lust and excess overtake the city. Even Medardus, a hermit, is overcome by her beauty, and he also is driven to commit sacrilegious acts.  Florence's fine buildings are turned into dens of sexual debauchery. Excess and manslaughter continue uninterrupted until the arrival of a ragged female figure personifying the Plague, who infects the whole city with her deadly disease and plays the fiddle while the population dies in droves.

Cast
 Otto Mannstädt as Cesare, ruler of Florence
 Anders Wikmann as Lorenzo, Cesare's Son
 Karl Bernhard as Lorenzo's confidant
  as A Fool
 Franz Knaak as The Cardinal 
  as A monk
 Marga von Kierska as Julia, a courtesan
 Auguste Prasch-Grevenberg as Julia's first servant 
 Hans Walter as Julia's confidant
 Theodor Becker as Medardus, a hermit 
 Julietta Brandt as The Plague

Production
The production company was Eric Pommer's Decla-Film Gesellschaft, founded in February 1915 from the assets of the German branch of the French Éclair company (hence the initials from Deutsche Éclair). Éclair, like all other foreign-owned firms, was banned in Germany from the start of WWI and their assets (such as equipment, leases on studios, offices, etc.) confiscated by the government and resold. Decla didn't become Decla-Bioskop until 1920, after merging with Deutsche Bioskop. The latter company was originally formed by Jules Greenbaum in 1899, sold to Carl Moritz Schleussner in 1908, and moved to the Babelsberg studios in 1911.

The imposing, crowd-filled, exterior sets of mediaeval Florentine architecture including the Medici Palace were designed by the architect Franz Jaffe (1855-1937), previously royal buildings advisor to the King of Prussia. Some of the more intimate interior scenes were filmed at the Weissensee Studios on 9 Franz Josef-Straße, Weissensee, Berlin, a glasshouse studio originally built in 1914 for the Continental-Kunstfilm production company.

The cameramen Willy Hameister and Emil Schünemann had previously filmed Continental's In Nacht und Eis, the first feature film about the sinking of the : one of the stars in that film was Otto Rippert, who then went on to direct some further ten films for Continental in 1912 and 1913, most of which are considered lost. See also List of films made by Continental-Kunstfilm. Cameraman Hameister had also previously worked on the hugely successful film The Cabinet of Dr. Caligari, released earlier that year. Rippert had earlier that year directed Dance of Death with  Fritz Lang's screenplay.

Performances
The film received its première at the Marmorhaus cinema in Berlin, but the music specially composed by Bruno Gellert wasn't finished in time, and wasn't played until several days later.

References 
Notes

Citations

Sources
 
 Halle, Randall; McCarthy, Margaret (2003). Light Motives: German Popular Film in Perspective. Wayne State University Press.
 
 Ott, Frederick W. (1979). The films of Fritz Lang. Carol Publishing Group.

External links 
 
 Pest in Florenz - complete film on Yoututbe

1919 films
1919 horror films
1910s historical horror films
German historical horror films
German epic films
Fiction set in the 1340s
Films based on works by Edgar Allan Poe
Films of the Weimar Republic
German silent feature films
Films directed by Otto Rippert
Films based on short fiction
Films set in Florence
Films about infectious diseases
Films set in the 14th century
German black-and-white films
Films produced by Erich Pommer
Films with screenplays by Fritz Lang
Works based on The Masque of the Red Death
Silent adventure films
Silent horror films
Films shot at Weissensee Studios
1910s German films